The National Kaunas Drama Theatre is the biggest theatre in Kaunas, and one of the oldest functioning theatres in Lithuania. There are six different creative spaces for events in the Kaunas Drama Theatre.

History 
Its beginnings date to the 1920s, when the Lithuanian Artists' Association established drama and opera playhouses.  The first play performed by the Kaunas Drama Theatre was Hermann Sudermann's St. John's Day, directed by Juozas Vaičkus, premiering on December 19, 1920, in the former Russian City Theatre, in what is now the Kaunas State Musical Theatre. The company was the only professional theatre organization in Lithuania until 1931 when its branch opened in Šiauliai.

Dramas shared the house with opera, and in 1925 they were joined by ballet. At that time the theatre was renamed "State Theatre". Most of the actors initially came from Juozas Vaičkus' Flying Theatre, founded in 1918 in St. Petersburg, Russia.

After some reforms, Konstantinas Glinskis became its new manager. In 1926 he was forced out by the new manager, Antanas Sutkus, along with many other actors. Sutkus brought in actors from the defunct Vilkolakis and Tautos theatres.

In 1928 Sutkus was replaced by Jurgis Savickis, who in 1929 invited Andrius Oleka-Žilinskas from the Moscow Art Theatre. Oleka-Žilinskas sought to improve performances using the methods of Konstantin Stanislavsky and Vladimir Nemirovich-Danchenko, and as part of this goal, he invited the renowned Mikhail Chekhov to join the theatre. Together they trained young actors and established The Young Theatre; although their work was acclaimed by critics, the broader public showed little appreciation. Later Oleka-Žilinskas was forced to leave the theatre.

Between 1935 and 1940 the theatre's ranks were reinforced by young people coming from The Young Theatre and the Experimental Theatre Acting Studio.

The Kaunas State Theatre was constantly delivering talents to other newly established theatres: the Šiauliai Theatre, the Youth Theatre, the Young Viewers' Theatre, and later, after Lithuania regained control of Vilnius, the Vilnius State Theatre.

In 1940, when Lithuania was annexed by the Soviet Union, the theatre was forced to implement the socialist understanding of art and was forced to praise the new regime.  During the Nazi occupation of Lithuania, demands for the praise of that regime were also made.

After the second Soviet occupation, socialist realism was enforced. In 1947 a group of Lithuanian students went to GITS, (now known as the Russian Theatre Academy), and when they returned after graduating in 1952, a new era began at the theatre. In 1959 the organization was merged with the Kaunas Young Viewer's Theatre and moved to its present location at Laisvės alėja 71.

Notable actors 
Algirdas Masiulis
Antanina Vainiūnaitė
Dainius Svobonas
Ingeborga Dapkūnaitė
Juozas Budraitis
Jūratė Onaitytė
Konstantinas Glinskis
Ona Jonaitytė
Rūta Staliliūnaitė
Viktoras Šinkariukas
Vytautas Grigolis

Notable directors
Andrius Oleka-Žilinskas
Borisas Dauguvietis
Eimuntas Nekrošius
Gintaras Varnas
Henrikas Vancevičius
Jonas Jurašas
Jonas Vaitkus
Konstantinas Glinskis
Stasys Motiejūnas

Notable scenographers 
Mstislav Dobuzhinsky
Liudas Truikys

Notable plays
Barbora Radvilaitė by Juozas Grušas
Herkus Mantas  by Juozas Grušas
Baltaragis's Mill
The Pilgrim of Dreams
Ubu Roi by Alfred Jarry
Thrush, the Green Bird

External links
Official webpage

1920 establishments in Lithuania
Performing groups established in 1920
Theatres in Kaunas